In the military, a political commissar or political officer (or , a portmanteau word from ;  or political official) is a supervisory officer responsible for the political education (ideology) and organization of the unit to which they are assigned, with the intention of ensuring political control of the military.

The function first appeared as commissaire politique (political commissioner) or représentant en mission (representative on mission) in the French Revolutionary Army during the French Revolution (1789–1799). Political commissars were heavily used within the International Brigades during the Spanish Civil War (1936–1939). They also existed, with interruptions, in the Soviet Red Army from 1918 to 1942, as well as in the armed forces of Nazi Germany from 1943 to 1945 as Nationalsozialistische Führungsoffiziere (national socialist leadership officers).

The function remains in use in China's People's Liberation Army and Taiwan's Republic of China Army and also Vietnam's People's Army.

China

People's Republic of China
The position of political commissar also exists in the People's Liberation Army of China. Usually, the political commissar is a uniformed military officer and Chinese Communist Party cadre, although this position has been used to give civilian party officials some experience with the military. The political commissar was head of a party cell within the military; however, military membership in the party has been restricted to the lower ranks since the 1980s. Today the political commissar is largely responsible for administrative tasks such as public relations and counseling, and mainly serves as second-in-command. Chinese troops reportedly spend "20 to 30 percent of their time studying communist ideology".

Republic of China

The position of political commissar (literal translation "Political Warfare Officer") also existed in the Republic of China Army of the Republic of China (Taiwan). Chiang Ching-kuo, appointed as Kuomintang (Chinese Nationalist Party) director of Secret Police in 1950, was educated in the Soviet Union, and initiated Soviet style military organization in the Republic of China Armed Forces, reorganizing and Sovietizing the political officer corps, surveillance, and Kuomintang party activities were propagated throughout the military. Opposed to this was Sun Li-jen, who was educated at the American Virginia Military Institute. Chiang Ching-kuo then arrested Sun Li-jen, charging him of conspiring with the American Central Intelligence Agency of plotting to overthrow Chiang Kai-shek and the Kuomintang. Sun was placed under house arrest in 1955.

Today, political commissars belongs to the Political Warfare Bureau; and are still responsible for the planning and supervision of the political operations of the Republic of China Army where they are involved in psychological warfare, preparing propaganda for external consumption, along with providing counseling, psychological warfare training and processing news for the Taiwanese military.

Nazi Germany

From December 1943 until the defeat of Nazi Germany, the German armed forces created a network of political instructors to maintain National Socialist indoctrination of the Wehrmacht. The officers, called Nationalsozialistische Führungsoffiziere (NSFO; "National Socialist Leadership Officers"), drawn from staunchly Nazi officers and approved by Martin Bormann, head of the Nazi Party Chancellery, to instill ideological conviction and reinforce combat morale through training lessons and teaching. Contrary to Soviet political commissars, NSFO united military command and political instruction, with company-level commanders also serving as their unit's NSFO. At the end of 1944 more than 1,100 full-time and about 47,000 part-time instructors had been trained under the overall control of General Hermann Reinecke, commander of the National Socialist leadership staff at the OKW.

The NSFO Chiefs of Staff of the Service Branches were:
 Army: Generaloberst Ferdinand Schörner (until 15 May 1944), then General der Gebirgstruppe Georg Ritter von Hengl
 Navy: Vizeadmiral Friedrich Hüffmeier (until 21 June 1944), then Konteradmiral Erich Alfred Breuning 
 Air Force: Generaloberst Bruno Loerzer

Soviet Union and the Eastern Bloc

An early kind of political commissar was established during the February Revolution 1917 as the Ispolkom issued the controversial Order no 1. As the Bolsheviks came to power through the October Revolution of November 1917, and as the Russian Civil War of 1917–1922 began, Leon Trotsky gradually established the Red Army and set up the role of political officers. They were tasked with making sure that communist parties could count on the loyalty of armed forces. Although there was a huge difference between the February Revolution and the October Revolution, their leaders in each case feared a counter-revolution, and both regarded the military officers as the most likely counter-revolutionary threat.

Later commissars in the Eastern bloc could exercise broader roles in social engineering.

In the Soviet Union 

The office of political commissar is often associated with the Soviet Union (1922–1991). At the start of the Soviet period in 1917, revolutionary military units had different, and often conflicting, political goals, and there were many marxist political parties and movements at that time who despite their differing doctrines supported the Bolsheviks' 1917 seizure of power. Each group had party members and sympathizers among the military, and tried to use that to benefit their goals. The Left SRs and the Anarchists were vicious competitors, less popular among the lower ranks than the Bolsheviks, and often contesting them. The Bolsheviks saw this as a matter of life and death during the ongoing civil war of 1917–1922 against the White movement. To strengthen their control over the entire military, they introduced the position of commissar. Another reason was the frequent appointment of ex-Tsarist officers to positions of command in the Red Army. The Bolsheviks worried about the influence of officers with potential White Army sympathies - the commissars helped to ensure that soldiers remained loyal to the Bolsheviks. After the Left SRs came under Bolshevik control (by 1921), the forces loyal to them split from the Red Army and often joined the Green armies, and guerrilla war soon erupted in the countryside along with civil war. The commissars had the task of preventing troops, both commanding officers and other soldiers, from leaning towards other forces. There were many examples of defiance and outspoken disobedience, with soldiers killing or exiling their commissars, and then switching sides to the Greens. After the Bolsheviks exterminated all rival armies, they became the sole official political party in Soviet Russia.

In the Red Army (1918–1946) and the Soviet Army (1946–1991), the political commissar existed, by name, only during the 1918–1924, 1937–1940, and 1941–1942 periods; not every Red Army political officer was a commissar. The political commissar held military rank equaling the unit commander to whom he was attached; moreover, the commissar also had the military authority to countermand the unit-commander's orders at any time. During the other periods of the Red Army's history political officers were militarily subordinate to unit commanders, and the position of political commissar did not exist.

The political supervision of the Russian military was effected by the political commissar, who was present in every unit and formation, from company- to division-level, including in the navy. Revolutionary Military Councils (or Revvoyensoviets, RVS) were established at army-, front-, fleet-, and flotilla-level, comprising at least three members—the commander and two political workers. The political workers were denominated "members of the RVS", not "commissars", despite their position as official political commissars.

In 1919, the title politruk was assigned to political officers at company level. Despite their position as official political commissars, they were not addressed as "commissar". Beginning in 1925, the politico-military doctrinal course toward edinonachalie (single command) was established, and the political commissar, as a military institution, faded. The introduction of edinonachalie was two-fold, either the military commander joined the Communist Party and became his own unit's political officer, or a pompolit (assistant commander for political work) officer was commissioned sub-ordinate to him. Earlier, in 1924, the RVSs were renamed as Military Councils, such high-level political officers were known as ChVS (Chlen Voennogo Soveta, Member of the Military Council); they were abolished in 1934.

On 10 May 1937, the role of political commissar was reinstated in the Red Army, and Military Councils were set up. These derived from the political purges in the Soviet armed forces. Again, in August 1940, the office of political commissars was abolished, yet the Military Councils continued throughout the German-Soviet War (1941–1945), and after. Below army level, the edinonachalie (single-command) system was restored. In July 1941, consequent to the Red Army's defeats at the war's start, the position of political commissar reappeared. The commissars had an influential role as "second commanders" within the military units during this time. Their rank and insignia generally paralleled those of officers. Because this proved ineffective, General Konev asked Stalin to subordinate the political officer to commanding officers: the commissars' work was re-focused to morale-related functions. The term "commissar" was abolished in August 1942, and at the company- and regiment-level, the pompolit officer was replaced with the zampolit (deputy for political matters). Although no longer known by the original "commissar" title, political officers were retained by all the Soviet Armed Forces, e.g., Army, Navy, Air Force, Strategic Missile Troops, et al, until the dissolution of the Soviet Union in 1991.

Red Army rank designations 
Armeysky komissar 1-go ranga (Army Commissar 1st rank)
Armeysky komissar 2-go ranga (Army Commissar 2nd rank)
Korpusnoy komissar (Commissar of the corps)
Divizionny komissar (Commissar of the division)
Brigadny komissar (Commissar of the brigade)
Polkovoy komissar (Commissar of the regiment)
Starshi batalonny komissar (Senior commissar of the battalion)
Batalonny komissar (Commissar of the battalion)
Starshy politruk (Senior politleader)
Politruk (Politleader)
Mladshy politruk (Junior politleader)

Eastern Bloc armies 
After World War II, other Eastern Bloc armies also used political officers patterned on the Soviet model. For example, East Germany's Nationale Volksarmee used Politoffiziere as the unit commander's deputy responsible for political education.
During the Korean War, the Korean People's Army commissars were known as "Cultural Sections" or "Political Sections".

See also
Cadre (military)
Commissar Order
Military commissariat
Military organisation

References

Citations

Sources

External links
 The Communist Party and the Red Army – On the military commissar, Leon Trotsky

Military of the Soviet Union
Occupations in the Communist Party of the Soviet Union
Civil–military relations
Commissars
People's Liberation Army
Propaganda
Political communication